Sarek is a Vulcan character in the Star Trek fictional universe.

Sarek may also refer to:

 Sarek National Park, a national park in Jokkmokk Municipality in northern Sweden
 Sarek (Star Trek novel), a novel by A. C. Crispin
 "Sarek" (Star Trek: The Next Generation), episode 23 from the third season of Star Trek: The Next Generation
 Sarek (band), a Swedish folk/pop band

See also 
 Sarektjåkkå